Operation Trishul ( Triśūla, lit. "Operation Trishul"), along with Operation Viraat, was an anti-insurgency operation launched by the IPKF against the LTTE in April 1988 in Northern Sri Lanka, in the provinces of Maannar to Mullaitivu and Elephant Pass to Vavuniya.

The operation was planned as a result of the evolving doctrine among the Indian high command of conducting search and destroy missions against LTTE strongholds instead of holding key strongpoints.

References

1988 in Sri Lanka
20th-century conflicts
Trishul
1988 in India